The Marsh Railway is a main line in the state of Schleswig-Holstein in Germany that links the stations of Elmshorn in the south and Westerland on the island of Sylt in the north. The first part of it was opened in 1845 and is one of the oldest lines in Germany.

Route

The Marsh Railway, as its name suggests, mainly runs through marshlands. There are also some sections of the line that run through the higher-lying geest. The line branches off the Hamburg-Altona-Kiel railway line in Elmshorn. From Elmshorn, it runs in an arc via Glückstadt to Itzehoe. There is also a bascule bridge north of Husum station. Between Klanxbüll and Morsum stations the line runs across the Hindenburgdamm (causeway) through the North Frisian mudflats.

History 
The first section of the current Marsh Railway was built by the Glückstadt-Elmshorn Railway Company (Glückstadt-Elmshorner Eisenbahn-Gesellschaft) shortly after the opening of the Altona–Kiel line on 18 September 1844.  The company opened a line from Elmshorn to Glückstadt port station on 20 July 1845. Twelve years later, on 15 October 1857, the line was realigned in Glückstadt and extended to the edge of the Stör river in Itzehoe. In 1878, a swing bridge was built across the Stör—which was replaced in 1910 during the duplication of the line by two bascule bridges—and the line was extended to the Heide station of the Neumünster–Heide–Karolinenkoog line, which opened on 22 August 1877.

On 1 January 1879 the Glückstadt-Elmshorn Railway Company became the Holstein Marsh Railway Company (Holsteinische Marschbahn-Gesellschaft). In 1888, this company was acquired by the Schleswig-Holstein Marsh Railway Company (Schleswig-Holsteinische Marschbahn-Gesellschaft). On 1 July 1890, the company was acquired by the Prussian government and it became part of the Prussian State Railways.

In 1886 construction began on an extension and on 1 September 1886 the line was opened via Lunden and a bridge over the Eider near Friedrichstadt to Husum, where it connected with the Flensburg–Husum–Tönning line. The line was extended further north to Bredstedt on 17 October 1887 and to Niebüll on 15 November 1887. The line was subsequently extended further north to Tønder, connecting to branch lines to Tinglev and Højer Sluse, which was the port for a ferry connection to Sylt. The line was extended to Bredebro, Scherrebek, Ribe and Bramming, where it connected with the Danish rail network.

1920-1926 

In 1920 northern Schleswig became part of Denmark, and the border was established between Niebüll and Tønder. This meant that traffic to Sylt had to cross the German-Danish border twice, although the Danish authorities allowed sealed transit trains to operate, avoiding customs inspections of passengers. The operation of transit trains and the Hoyer–Sylt ferry ended with the inauguration of the Hindenburg causeway in 1927.

Originally, the Marsh Railway ran from Wilster directly to St. Michaelisdonn. During the construction of the Kiel Canal a swing bridge was built on the line at Taterpfahl near St. Margarethen. During the widening of the canal in 1920, a new non-opening high bridge was built on the geest at Hochdonn on a 5.8 km long bypass route. The new train route with the new bridge was originally planned directly from Itzehoe to Meldorf, but because of protests from Wilster and Sankt Michaelisdonn, the line was elongated and rerouted to include these towns. The old track was rebuilt to run from Wilster to Brunsbüttelkoog and on the north side to Brunsbüttel Nord.

1927-1948 
Significant changes took place on 1 June 1927 with the opening of Hindenburg causeway, which was prepared in 1922 by prolonging the line from Niebüll to Klanxbüll to enable material transports. Deutsche Reichsbahn (German State Railways) opened a new station at Westerland together with the connecting part of the line. The Sylt Island Railway lost its traffic between Munkmarsch and Westerland, because the ferry service between Hoyer and Sylt had been closed. The Island Railway built a station next to the Reichsbahn station, with a simple reception building.

1948–1993 
After World War II many (often long) express trains ran to Westerland, especially in the summer season. Most trains ran beyond Hamburg towards Cologne and the Ruhr, some went to southern Germany. Daily service also operated as interzonal trains from Berlin (running without stopping in the former East Germany), which were augmented in the summer at weekends by a second pair of trains.

Until the 1970s, these services were hauled by class 01.10 locomotives. These were replaced by class 218 diesels.

A significant improvement of services on the Marsh line occurred with the timetable of summer 1978. Regular interval Intercity (IC) trains were introduced between Cologne and Hamburg, with some first and second class carriages running beyond Hamburg to Westerland. A year later IC connections from Westerland to Frankfurt am Main and Munich were added.

Clock-face timetable since 1991 
The 1991 there was a complete transformation of the passenger transport services on the Marsh line and in Schleswig–Holstein. New two-hourly express trains were introduced that ran between Hamburg and Heide making even fewer stops than IC trains. These trains were aimed at offering travel times of less than two and a half hours from Hamburg to North Sea resorts, such as Büsum via Heide, Dagebüll via Niebüll and Sankt Peter-Ording via Husum. Hourly local trains were introduced, stopping at all stations to Husum. Trains were added during peak hours from Pinneberg to Itzehoe.

Notes

References

External links 

 The Marschbahn
 Route description
 The last days of the DB-RBSH on the Marsh Railway
 Photo reports at Bahnfotokiste about the Marsh Railway by Jan Borchers
 Photo gallery of the block section by Jan-Geert Lukner
 route overview and kilometrage

Railway lines in Schleswig-Holstein
Railway lines in Denmark
Railway lines opened in 1845
Establishments in Schleswig-Holstein in 1845
Buildings and structures in Pinneberg (district)
Rail transport in the Region of Southern Denmark
Steinburg
Dithmarschen
Buildings and structures in Nordfriesland
Sylt